Psinidia fenestralis, known generally as longhorn band-wing grasshopper, is a species of band-winged grasshopper in the family Acrididae. Other common names include the long-horned grasshopper, long-horned locust, and sand locust. It is found in the Caribbean and North America.

References

Further reading

External links

 

Oedipodinae
Articles created by Qbugbot
Insects described in 1839
Orthoptera of North America